The 1908 University of New Mexico football team was an American football team represented the University of New Mexico as an independent during the 1908 college football season. The team compiled a 5–1 record and outscored all opponents by a total of 111 to 34. Walter R. Allen was the team captain.

Hermon H. Conwell was the first-year head coach. Conwell was a graduate of Kansas Agricultural College who was hired in 1908 and placed in charge of the mathematics department.

The Roswell Daily Record noted: "This was the first strictly college foot-ball game ever played in Roswell. It is the start of college athletics, and the lovers of this sort of sport are hoping that the spirit will grow."

On November 22, the team played its annual rivalry game against New Mexico Agricultural College (later renamed New Mexico State University). The university team won the game by a 10–6 score, the first victory for the university over the Aggies since 1894. Fullback Welcher drop-kicked a field goal for four points in the first half, and each team scored a touchdown in the second half.

On Thanksgiving Day, November 26, the team played Arizona in a game that matched two undefeated teams. Arizona had not allowed any of its prior opponents to score a point and won the game by a 10–5 score. The Albuquerque Morning Journal called it "very decidedly the best football game ever seen in New Mexico or Arizona". The game was also the first meeting between the two universities, marking the start of the Arizona–New Mexico football rivalry.

Schedule

References

University of New Mexico football
New Mexico Lobos football seasons
University of New Mexico football football